Nimra Khan (born 26 June 1991) is a Pakistani actress. Khan made her acting debut with a brief role in comedy series Kis Din Mera Viyah Howay Ga (2013). She is known for her leading role in several television serials including Meherbaan (2017), Uraan (2019), Khoob Seerat (2020) and Mein Jeena Chahti Hoon (2020). In 2016, Khan made her film debut with Blind Love.Mujhe Khuda Pay Yaqeen Hai (2021).

Career

Television 
Nimra started her career in a brief role in Kis Din Mera Viyah Howay Ga, she also played a lead role in television play Khwaab Tabeer on PTV. She is known for her performances in Kaisi Khushi Lekar Aaya Chand on A-Plus, opposite Ahsan Khan, Rishta Anjana Sa on Ary Digital and Choti Si Zindagi on Hum TV. In 2019, she had a good year as she was praised for her performances in the smash-hit drama Bhool on ARY Digital and popular hit series Uraan on A-Plus.

Film 
Her debut film was Blind Love in which she played the lead role of the blind woman Sara. She appeared as Hayya in Saya e Khuda e Zuljalal, an action-war film about the Pakistan independence.

Personal life 
Nimra Khan was born on 26 June 1991 in Karachi, her home town.

On 21 August 2014 she was seriously injured in a road accident. Her car got hit badly by a van while she was coming back from her shoot. Her right leg fractured from five different points. Doctors were not able to fix them immediately as there were a few clots in her brain. She got married on 19 April 2020 in Karachi and her husband was a police officer in London but it’s rumoured that they parted their ways however Khan didn’t mention publicly about their marriage status. Her husband announced in August 2021 that they were divorced.

Filmography

Film

Television

Music video

References

External links 
 

21st-century Pakistani actresses
Pakistani female models
1990 births
Living people
Pakistani film actresses
Pakistani television actresses
Actresses from Karachi
Indus Valley School of Art and Architecture alumni
Pakistani emigrants to the United Kingdom